Meitei poetry day, formally termed as Manipuri poetry day, is an annual literary event organised to promote the poetries in Meitei language (officially called Manipuri language). It is organised in Manipur as well as in other Meitei speakers populated areas, aiming to popularise and expose Meitei literature (Manipuri literature) to the world.
The poetry day honours the contributions of the poets of Meitei literature as well as the diverse and distinctive uncommon literary traditions of the Meitei language.

Dates of celebrations

Organisers

National level 
 Sahitya Akademi

In Manipur 
 Manipuri Sahitya Parishad, Jiribam (MSPJ)
 Divine Life Club, Langthabal
 Fiction and Poetry Club, Manipur
 JN Manipur Dance Academy (JNMDA)
 Manipur Dramatic Union, Yaiskul
 Naharol Sahitya Premee Samiti, Imphal

In Nagaland 
 St. Joseph University, Nagaland (SJU)

In West Bengal 
 "Manipuri in Kolkata" (MIK)
 Manipur Bhavan, Kolkata

See also 
 Meitei language movements
 Meitei Chanu (poem)
 Khamba Thoibi Sheireng
 Numit Kappa
 Tha Tha Thabungton
 Sana Leibak Manipur

Notes

References

External links 

Annual events in India
Literary festivals in India
Meitei language
Meitei literature
October observances
Observances in India
Poetry festivals